A typographical error (often shortened to typo), also called a misprint, is a mistake (such as a spelling mistake) made in the typing of printed (or electronic) material. Historically, this referred to mistakes in manual type-setting. Technically, the term includes errors due to mechanical failure or slips of the hand or finger, but excludes errors of ignorance, such as spelling errors, or changing and misuse of words such as "than" and "then". Before the arrival of printing, the copyist's mistake or scribal error was the equivalent for manuscripts. Most typos involve simple duplication, omission, transposition, or substitution of a small number of characters.

Fat finger or fat-finger syndrome (especially in the financial sector) is a slang term referring to an unwanted secondary action when typing. When a finger is bigger than the touch zone, with touchscreens or keyboards, there can be inaccuracy and one may hit two keys in a single keystroke. An example is buckled instead of bucked, due to the "L" key being next to the "K" key on the QWERTY keyboard, the most common keyboard for Latin-script alphabets.

Marking typos

When using a typewriter without correction tape, typos were commonly overstruck with another character such as a slash. This saved the typist the trouble of retyping the entire page to eliminate the error, but as evidence of the typo remained, it was not aesthetically pleasing.

In computer forums, sometimes "^H" (a visual representation of the ASCII backspace character) was used to "erase" intentional typos: "Be nice to this fool^H^H^H^Hgentleman, he's visiting from corporate HQ."

In instant messaging, users often send messages in haste and only afterward notice the typo. It is common practice to correct the typo by sending a subsequent message in which an asterisk is placed before (or after) the correct word.

In formal prose, it is sometimes necessary to quote text containing typos or other doubtful words. In such cases, the author will write "[sic]" to indicate that an error was in the original quoted source rather than in the transcription.

Scribal errors
Scribal errors received a lot of attention in the context of textual criticism. Many of these mistakes aren't specific to manuscripts and can be referred to as typos. Some classifications include homeoteleuton and homeoarchy (skipping a line due to the similarity of the ending or beginning), haplography (copying once what appeared twice), dittography (copying twice what appeared once), contamination (introduction of extraneous elements), metathesis (reversing the order of some elements), unwitting mistranscription of similar elements, mistaking similar looking letters, the substitution of homophones, fission and fusion (joining or separating words).

Biblical errors 

The Wicked Bible omits the word "not" in the commandment "thou shalt not commit adultery".

The Judas Bible is a copy of the second folio edition of the authorized version, printed by Robert Barker, printer to King James I, in 1613, and given to the church for the use of the Mayor of Totnes. This edition is known as the Judas Bible because in Matthew 26:36 "Judas" appears instead of "Jesus". In this copy, the mistake (in the red circle) is corrected with a slip of paper pasted over the misprint.

"Intentional" typos
Certain typos, or kinds of typos, have acquired widespread notoriety and are occasionally used deliberately for humorous purposes. For instance, the British newspaper The Guardian is sometimes referred to as The Grauniad due to its reputation for frequent typesetting errors in the era before computer typesetting. This usage began as a running joke in the satirical magazine Private Eye. The magazine continues to refer to The Guardian by this name.

Typos are common on the internet in chatrooms, Usenet, and the World Wide Web, and some—such as "teh", "pwned", and "zomg"—have become in-jokes among Internet groups and subcultures. P0rn is not a typo but an example of obfuscation, where people make a word harder for filtering software to understand while retaining its meaning to human readers.

In mapping, it was common practice to include deliberate errors so that copyright theft could be identified.

Typosquatting

Typosquatting is a form of cybersquatting that relies on typographical errors made by users of the Internet. Typically, the cybersquatter will register a likely typo of a frequently-accessed website address in the hope of receiving traffic when internet users mistype that address into a web browser. Deliberately introducing typos into a web page, or into its metadata, can also draw unwitting visitors when they enter these typos in Internet search engines.

An example of this is gogole.com instead of google.com which could potentially be harmful to the user.

Typos in online auctions
Since the emergence and popularization of online auction sites such as eBay, misspelled auction searches have quickly become lucrative for people searching for deals. The concept on which these searches are based is that, if an individual posts an auction and misspells its description and/or title, regular searches will not find this auction. However, a search that includes misspelled alterations of the original search term in such a way as to create misspellings, transpositions, omissions, double strikes, and wrong key errors would find most misspelled auctions. The resulting effect is that there are far fewer bids than there would be under normal circumstances, allowing the searcher to obtain the item for less. A series of third-party websites have sprung up allowing people to find these items.

Atomic typos
Another kind of typo—informally called an "atomic typo"—is a typo that happens to result in a correctly spelled word that is different from the intended one. Since it is spelled correctly, a simple spellchecker cannot find the mistake. The term was used at least as early as 1995 by Robert Terry.

A few illustrative examples include: 
 "now" instead of "not",
 "unclear" instead of "nuclear"
 "you" instead of "your"
 "Sudan" instead of "sedan" (leading to a diplomatic incident in 2005 between Sudan and the United States regarding a nuclear test code-named Sedan)
 "Untied States" instead of "United States"
 "the" instead of "they"
and many more. For any of these, the converse is also true.

See also

 
 
 
 
 
 
 
 Typography the art and technique of arranging type to make written language legible, readable and appealing when displayed. Typographers design pages; traditionally, typesetters "set" the type to accord with that design.

References

External links

BookErrata.com
"How Many Errorrs are in this Essay?" on famous typos, in The Millions

Error
Typing
Typography
Printing terminology
Nonstandard spelling